The following lists events that happened during 1970 in Cambodia.

Incumbents 
 Monarch: Norodom Sihanouk (until 18 March), Cheng Heng (starting 21 March)
 Prime Minister: Lon Nol

Events

October
 October 9 - The Khmer Republic was formally declared as the government of Cambodia.

See also
List of Cambodian films of 1970

References

 
1970s in Cambodia
Years of the 20th century in Cambodia
Cambodia
Cambodia